Minocher Bhandara (died June 15, 2008), popularly known as Minoo, was a Pakistani businessman and former minority representative and member of the National Assembly of Pakistan (MNA).

Family
He belonged to the small Gujarati-speaking Zoroastrian community. Bhandara was the brother of Pakistani novelist, Bapsi Sidhwa. His father owned a liquor shop on the Mall in Lahore, Pakistan.
 
His son, Isphanyar Bhandara, is the current CEO of Murree Brewery.

Career
He was the architect and owner of one of the most successful and durable business conglomerates in Pakistan. Amongst his companies was the Murree Brewery, which his father had bought a controlling share in during the British Empire in the 1940s.

Politics
He leaves behind a legacy of enlightened political activism. Bhandara, was active as a minority representative and served as MNA from November 16, 2002 to November 15, 2007 affiliated with Pakistan Muslim League (Q). Before that, he had also served as a member of National Assembly of Pakistan from 14 April 1972 to 7 March 1977 during Zulfiqar Ali Bhutto regime.

Minoo also wrote articles in the country's English language newspapers.

Death
He died in Islamabad, Pakistan on Sunday June 15, 2008 at the age of 71, due to complications as a result of a serious car accident in China several weeks earlier on 23 April 2008.

References

Pakistani industrialists
Pakistani Zoroastrians
Parsi people
2008 deaths
Year of birth missing
Pakistani MNAs 1972–1977
Pakistani MNAs 2002–2007
Pakistani people of Gujarati descent